St. Sylvester's College is a national boys' school located in Kandy, adjacent to the St. Anthony's Cathedral. It was founded by the Sylvestro Benedictine Congregation in 1940. It offers primary and secondary education and the college is under the jurisdiction of the Ministry of Education.

It has around 150 teaching staff and approximately 3,000 students.

History

The first decades

St. Sylvester's began as a separate institution on 1 November 1940 (All Saints' Day) with Fr. D. Robert Perera as the principal. The college owed its inception to the foresight of Bishop Bernardo Regno and Abbot Weerasinghe, the heads of the Sylvestro-Benedictine congregation. They felt that a Catholic school in Kandy was a prime need, once the most prestigious St Anthony's College had been shifted to the banks of the Mahaweli at Katugastota. The school commenced with 250 pupils and twelve teachers.

During the tenure of Fr. Perera as principal from 1940 to 1949 and as rector from 1949 until his death in 1956, St. Sylvester's underwent a transformation from a senior secondary school to an "A" grade institution. Under the stewardship of Perera, the Pancrazi Memorial Hall, and Cingolani Memorial Hall were built and two new blocks were added as well. 
                                                                             
Fr. Robert Perera negotiated with the education department and obtained another parcel of land above the Kandy-Matale railway line, which skirts one side of St. Sylvester's. A science laboratory, workshop, and library were creations of Fr. Robert, who was, the designer and builder of St. Sylvester's. Perera was a builder in more than one sense. He believed essentially in molding Sylvestrians in a Christ-like character under the Benedictine spirituality to lead a life of harmony as citizens of this alluring isle of Ceylon.

He had great faith in harmonizing the classroom with the playing field and was instrumental in providing the sports facilities that the school needed, a tennis court and a boxing ring. During his tenure, the school won the Stubbs Shield in boxing for three successive years, produced outstanding sportspeople, who won the national championship while in college, and represented the country at international events such as the British Empire Games. In the academic field St. Sylvester produced many outstanding students who have shone in many professions.

D. Joseph Noel Seneviratne took over the reins as the principal in 1949, envisaged by Perera, who remained as the director. After the death of Fr. Robert in 1956, Rev Paulinus Vadekapattany OSB succeeded as the rector. Principal Seneviratne served the college for 24 years.

In 1961, the Primary department was established on Lady Manning's Drive, close to the school's main administrative building. In 1968, Seneviratne resigned to take over the duties as the director of a junior university, and the Vice-Principal, K.S. Gunaratne, succeeded him.

The school celebrated its 80th anniversary in 2020, with a nine-a-side hockey tournament, a football competition and other events.

List of Principals

Awards

Cingolani Gold Medal
The Cingolani Gold Medal is awarded each year to the "best all-round boy" at St. Sylvester's College. The Cingolani Gold Medal is the highest honor that the school can bestow. It is awarded annually to the best all-round student with the best performance in academics and sports in honorable memory of Abbot Leo Cingolani, the third Sylvestrine monk to arrive in British Ceylon. It is awarded using on a secret ballot conducted among the senior boys and the staff whose votes, together with that of the Rector (now Principal). This is awarded at the prize-giving under the patronage of the chief guest.

Past winners of Cingolani Gold Medal:
1948 - Z. N. Massis,
1952 - G. S. Fernando.
1953 - Hillary Perera,
1954 - M. Marshall.
1956 - Gerry Alexander Hidelaratchchi
1962 - Mervyn Rodrigo
1967 - Daya Laxman
1969 - Junaid M. Ayub
1971 - Kithsiri Wijesundara
1986 - Mohammed Niyaz
2019 - Sanka Daminda

Main administrative building

The main administrative building is the oldest academic building within the world heritage zone by UNESCO and declared as a conserved structure. Formerly owned by St. Anthony's College, Kandy, this four-storied building is a blend of Victorian, Edwardian, and Georgian styles.

College Crest
The current college crest was designed by the then head prefect, Master Kiriella:

The Crown
- Represents Royalty. The highest authority of the country during the time of the school's inception.

The Red Cross
- Represents the Roman Catholic faith on which the school was built.

The Book
- Represents the Holy Bible and education

The cloud and the rays
- Depicts the concept of heaven and that the heavenly blessings will shower upon the school through the Holy Spirit.

The Mountains
- Represents the city of Kandy, the hill capital.

The Wand
- Represents the wand of the patron, St. Sylvester, and the authority of the Sylvestro Benedictine Congregation.

The flower trees and the bees.
- The bees represents the students and the old boys while the trees represent the school from which they benefit and benefitted.

The Scroll
- Includes the motto "Fortiter In Re".

School anthem

St. Sylvester's College has used various school anthems since 1940. During the early years God Save the King was sung as a school anthem, followed by the Pasal Mavuni Jaya Wewa anthem and in the 1970s it was changed to Dana Mana Ranjitha anthem.

Clubs and Societies

St. Sylvester's scout troop

In 1945 St. Sylvester's College, Kandy started their first scout troop with the patronage of founder Fr. Robert M. Perera. The scout troop had been started by B. M. Guyes. In 1949 Guyes left the scout troop in charge of Fr. Dom. George. Next came Mr. K.S. Gunarathne. He was joined by able Scouters N. H. Shalwyn and W. L. D. V. Jayawardene.

Both of these scoutmasters had contributed in great measure to the success of the scout troop. In 1950 the scouts won the "Island Merit Flag", awarded to the best troop on the island. The presentation was made by Governor-General Lord Soulbury. In 1986 and 1988 the group won the "Gulam Hussain" flag for the group with the highest number of president's scouts.

St. Sylvester's College gymnastics club

In 2002 St. Sylvester's College introduced gymnastics as a primary sport to the college students. St. Sylvester's Gymnastics Club was founded by the school's principal, T. R. S. Meetiyagoda, assistant principal A. K. B. Dodanwala, former prefect of games, D.C. Mahawaththage, and Amal Rasanga Liyanagamage (coach and old boy).

Interact Club of St. Sylvester's College 

The Interact Club of St. Sylvester's College Kandy has been an outstanding club over the past 30 years. Sponsored by the parent club, Rotary Club of Kandy, the club was charted in 1989. Interactors of St. Sylvester's College Kandy have been working with "Unparalleled Humanity" for the benefit of the underprivileged as well as for the betterment of the school. The Interact Club of St. Sylvester's College has been one of the leading clubs in Sri Lanka actively carrying out major projects through the five avenues: Finance, Community Service, International Understanding, Club Service, and Green Life.

The English Literary Association of St. Sylvester's College

The English Literary Association is a society made for lovers of literature to get together and share ideas and discuss all things literature. The main objective of the ELA is to bring together like minded students and provide a place for them to improve their skills in writing, leaning and get a deeper understanding of the art of literature. To achieve this objective we engage in projects with the collaboration of the other members with the goal of building team work and leadership qualities. Find ELA on Instagram

ICT Society of St. Sylvester's College (VITS) 

The ICT society of St. Sylvester's College Kandy, also known as VITS is one of the most ambitious ICT society in Sri Lanka that has become the best of the best by organizing remarkable online and physical projects and events and by achieving consecutive victories and titles in the field of ICT for more than 25 years.

Millennium Sylvestrians Union (MSU)

Millennium Sylvestrian Union is for the Sylvestrians who sat for their A/Ls in 2000 and above in St Sylvester's College, Kandy, Sri Lanka and it was established in 2010.Even though the MSU was formed by the batch of 2000, it has been a practice that everyone takes part in all the events organised by the MSU Sylvestrians Motor Rally which is organised annually during the Big Match (Battle of the Babes) between St. Sylvester's College and Vidyartha College is one of the main events organised by MSU.

See also
 List of St. Sylvester's College alumni

References

External links 

 St. Sylvester's College on Facebook

1940 establishments in Ceylon
Educational institutions established in 1940
Schools in Kandy